Bullockus honkeri is a species of sea snail, a marine gastropod mollusk in the family Fasciolariidae, the spindle snails, the tulip snails and their allies.

Description

Distribution

References

 Snyder M.A. (2006) Description of Hemipolygona honkeri sp. nov. from the Western Atlantic Ocean and Caribbean Sea (Gastropoda: Fasciolariidae: Peristerniinae). Visaya 1(6): 41-47

External links
 Lyons W.G. & Snyder M.A. (2008). New genera and species of Peristerniinae (Gastropoda: Fasciolariidae) from the Caribbean region, with comments on the fasciolariid fauna of Bermuda. The Veliger. 50(3): 225-240

Fasciolariidae
Gastropods described in 2006